David James Hensley (born March 28, 1996) is an American professional baseball infielder for the Houston Astros of Major League Baseball (MLB). He attended San Diego State University (SDSU), played college baseball for the Aztecs, and was selected by the Astros in the 26th round of the 2018 MLB draft.  He made his MLB debut in 2022.

Amateur career
From San Diego, California, David Hensley attended Patrick Henry High School and San Diego State University (SDSU), where he played college baseball for the Aztecs.  During his junior year, he led the Aztecs with a .357 batting average and played mostly right field.  During his college career, he played every position except catcher.

Professional career

Minor leagues
The Houston Astros selected Hensley in the 26th round of the 2018 MLB draft. He made his professional debut that year with the High-A Quad Cities River Bandits.  He spent the 2019 season with both Quad Cities and the Class A Fayetteville Woodpeckers. Hensley did not play in 2020 due to the cancellation of the Minor League Baseball season as a response to the Covid-19 pandemic.  

In 2021, Hensley played for the Corpus Christi Hooks.  Hensley was named the Hooks' Player of the Year after appearing in a team-high 105 games.  He achieved personal bests while simultaneously leading the club with 54 runs scored, a .293 batting average, 25 doubles, three triples, and 46 bases on balls.  He also tallied nine home runs, 51 runs batted in (RBI), 11 stolen bases and a .369 on-base percentage.

The Astros promoted Hensley to the Triple-A Sugar Land Space Cowboys to start the 2022 season.  On June 21, 2022, Hensley hit a three-run walk-off home run to lead Sugar Land to a 3–1 victory over the Tacoma Rainiers.  In Sugar Land, he batted .298/.420/.478 over 464 plate appearances and started at least 15 games at each of the four infield positions.

Major leagues
On August 20, 2022, the Astros selected Hensley's contract and promoted him to the major leagues.  He made his major league debut on August 27, 2022, starting at shortstop and going 0-for-3 with a strikeout versus the Baltimore Orioles at Minute Maid Park.  The following day, he doubled off Orioles starting pitcher Austin Voth in the third inning for his first major league hit.  He collected his first three-hit game and reached base four times in a game for the first time in the major leagues versus the Texas Rangers on August 31.  Hensley doubled home two runs on in fifth inning on September 4 versus Tucker Davidson of the Los Angeles Angels for his first two career RBI.  Hensley hit his first major league home run on September 27 in the sixth inning at Minute Maid Park versus Ian Kennedy of the Arizona Diamondbacks.

In 2022 he batted 10-for-27 with a home run and five RBIs with the Astros. He appeared at second base, third base, shortstop, left field, and as a DH and pinch hitter.

Hensley made his postseason debut in Game 1 of the 2022 American League Division Series (ALDS), appearing as a pinch hitter in the ninth inning.  He was hit by a Paul Sewald pitch, then replaced by Jake Meyers as pinch runner, who scored the lead run on a Yordan Álvarez three-run walk-off home run for an 8–7 final over the Seattle Mariners.  It was the first walk-off home run in an MLB postseason contest with the home team down to their final out in the ninth inning and trailing by more than one run.  The Astros advanced to the World Series and defeated the Philadelphia Phillies in six games to give Hensley his first career World Series title.

See also
 List of people from San Diego
 List of San Diego State University people

References

External links

1996 births
Living people
Anchorage Bucs players
Baseball players from San Diego
Cangrejeros de Santurce (baseball) players
Corpus Christi Hooks players
Fayetteville Woodpeckers players
Houston Astros players
Major League Baseball infielders
Quad Cities River Bandits players
San Diego State Aztecs baseball players
Sugar Land Space Cowboys players